The Mara is an  Italian stream (or torrente) of Insubria, which runs through the Italian Province of Como and the Swiss Canton Ticino. It rises on the slopes of Monte Sighignola and enters Lake Lugano at Maroggia.

Despite the small size of its drainage basin the river is able to provide a source of hydro-electricity through a power station belonging to the  Aziende industriali di Lugano.

The Mara's water level is liable to rapid and unpredictable augmentation following sudden storms.

Rivers of Ticino
Rivers of Lombardy
Rivers of the Province of Como
International rivers of Europe
Rivers of Switzerland
Rivers of Italy